Myron Eugene Taliaferro (pronounced "tollifur", born July 26, 1941) is a former collegiate and professional American football quarterback. He is best known for leading third-ranked Illinois to a 1964 Rose Bowl victory over Washington by the score of 17–7.

He played in eight American Football League and National Football League seasons from 1964 to 1972 for three teams, and was an AFL All-Star in 1969. In 1974, Taliaferro signed with the Houston Texans of the World Football League.

References

External links
 New York Jets online profile
 

1941 births
Living people
People from Houston
American football quarterbacks
Illinois Fighting Illini football players
New York Jets players
Boston Patriots players
Buffalo Bills players
American Football League All-Star players
Houston Texans (WFL) players
American Football League players